Omira is an unincorporated community in Lassen County, California.

A post office operated at Omira from 1910 to 1911 and from 1915 to 1918. The town was named by railroad officials for a woman who promised to build a church there if the town were named for her.

The Omira station closed in 1927.

References

Unincorporated communities in California
Unincorporated communities in Lassen County, California